The Coalesce / Boysetsfire is a split EP released in 2000. It featured six tracks: two covers of Boysetsfire by Coalesce, two Coalesce covers by Boysetsfire, and an original song from each band.

Track listing

Background

Personnel

Bands 
Coalesce
Sean Ingram – vocals
James Dewees – drums
Stacy Hilt – bass
Jes Steineger – guitar

Boysetsfire
Nathan Gray – vocals, keyboard
Josh Latshaw – guitar, vocals
Chad Istvan – guitar, vocals, piano, keyboard
Robert Ehrenbrand – bass guitar, vocals
Matt Krupanski – drums

Production 
Ed Rose – producer, engineer, mixing (Coalesce tracks)

Jacob Bannon – artwork, layout design, construction

Boysetsfire albums
Split EPs
2000 EPs
Hydra Head Records EPs
Coalesce (band) albums